Beduram Bhusal  ( is a current General Secretary of CPN (Unified Socialist). He is also member of Rastriya Sabha and is serving as leader of parliamentary party in the house.

References 
 

Year of birth missing (living people)
Living people
Communist Party of Nepal (Unified Socialist) politicians
Members of the National Assembly (Nepal)